Boxall is a surname. Notable people with the name include:

 Danny Boxall, English footballer
 Margaret Boxall, English badminton player
 Michael Boxall, New Zealand footballer
 Richard Boxall, English professional golfer 
 Steve Boxall, UK speedway rider
 Thomas Boxall, English cricketer
 Tony Boxall (1929–2010), British photographer
 William Boxall, (1800-1879) British painter

See also
 Boxall baronets